With the Philippine Archipelago comprising over 7,100 islands packed in an area of , the country has the fifth-longest coastline in the world.

Eleven of the largest islands of the archipelago are the major islands and main centers of population, with ten of its most populous cities located along the coast. Approximately 1,000 of the smaller islands are also populated.
	 
Large international ships rely on lighthouses to guide them safely out from the open sea and into Philippine waters.  Once within Philippine waters, lighthouses help them maneuver through its narrow straits and channels, pointing out safe passages and leading vessels to their destination ports.  Regardless of the advancement in technology and the use of satellite-guided positioning devices, mariners still rely on these light stations as visual confirmations of their electronic readings.

As an archipelago, the future and progress of the islands has and will always depend on maritime travel.  Even with the advent of aviation, the water routes continue to be the main highways for travel and commerce, with the lighthouses of the Philippines safely guiding the vessels that ply its routes.

List of lighthouses in the Philippines

The following is a list of historical and notable lighthouses constructed in the Philippines.

See also
 Lists of lighthouses and lightvessels

References

External links

Philippines Lighthouses from Picturesque Old Philippines
Amateur Radio Lighthouse Society List of Lights - Philippines
Light Stations of the Philippines from the Philippine Coast Guard Website

 01
Philippines
Lighthouses
Lighthouses
Lighthouses